William Chalmers Burns (宾惠廉, 1 April 1815 – 4 April 1868) was a Scottish Evangelist and Missionary to China with the English Presbyterian Mission who originated from Kilsyth, North Lanarkshire. He was the coordinator of the Overseas missions for the English Presbyterian church. He became a well known evangelist through his participation in two periodic Anglo-American religious revivals.

Biography 

Burns was brought up in a well-to-do household. The third son of a local church minister, William Hamilton Burns (1779–1859) and Elizabeth Chalmers (1784–1879). At the age of seventeen, Burns' faith was strengthened through tragedy, and he subsequently commenced theological training at Marischal College in Aberdeen, and at the University of Glasgow's Divinity Hall. (His brother Islay, author of Memoirs, was later a professor there).

During a revival meeting, he encountered an experience in which it became apparent that God had particularly appointed him into His service. By 1839, at the age of 24, Burns had obtained the licence to preach from the Glasgow Presbytery.

While still in his homeland of Scotland, he experienced, together with the preacher Robert Murray M'Cheyne, genuine revival meetings. It was one of the tools from which the great spiritual revivals in his home town of Kilsyth resulted, that took place from 1839-07-23.  Burns preached at St. Peter's in Dundee while Robert Murray M'Cheyne was away on a mission to the Jews in Palestine.  The days of revival also deeply affected Dundee, and continued after M'Cheyne returned to St. Peter's in November, 1839.

In 1843, Burns sided with Thomas Chalmers in the disruption within the Church of Scotland. In 1845, he visited Canada with his uncle, Robert Burns, minister from Paisley, and the younger Burns preached for the Free Church cause in many communities, including Montreal, Canada East, and in Glengarry County, where he preached in English, Gaelic and French. He later travelled into Canada West, although there was interest in his ministry in France. His uncle remained in Canada, becoming minister of Knox Church, Toronto and later (1856–1869) a professor at Knox College, University of Toronto.

In 1847, Burns went to the Chinese empire via Hong Kong. During this long ship journey, he spent a lot of time studying the Chinese language.  He began his missionary service during the late Qing dynasty in British Hong Kong and went on to preach in such locations as Shantou, Xiamen and Beijing.

In 1855 Burns met Hudson Taylor and the two worked together for quite some time. Both had the courage to advance into the Chinese interior. Hudson Taylor regarded Burns as one of his spiritual mentors and wrote about the depth of Burns' prayer life. Taylor, however, influenced Burns in the way in which he sought to contextualize his ministry by breaking with missionary tradition to wear Chinese clothing while evangelizing in China's interior. During his twenty years of preaching the gospel in China, Burns also spent a short period wrongly imprisoned at Guangzhou.

In 1868, Burns died after a short illness in Yingkou (Newchwang), (Liaoning Province).

One of William Burns' well known quotes was: "Always be ready" (1 Peter 3:15).

References

Citations

Sources

 Burns, William C., Revival Sermons, Banner of Truth Trust, 1980, 

 Clarke, Agnes H. L., China's man of the Book. The story of William Chalmers Burns, 1815–1868, London : Overseas Missionary Fellowship, 1968

 Houghton, S. M., Five pioneer missionaries: D. Brainerd, W. C. Burns, J. Eliot, H. Martyn, J. G. Paton, London : Banner of Truth Trust, 1965

 MacMillan, Donald N., The Kirk in Glengarry-A History of the Presbytery of Glengarry (Presbyterian Church in Canada) 1787–1984, 1985.

 McMullen, Michael D., God's Polished Arrow: W. C. Burns, Revival Preacher, Christian Focus Publications, 2000, 

 Stewart James Alexander, Biographical Sketches: William Chalmers Burns / Robert Murray McCheyne, Asheville, NC: Revival Literature, 1963
 Tow, Timothy, William C Burns: Grandfather of Bible-Presbyterians, Singapore: Christian Life Publishers, 1994.

Dutch 
 Valen, L. J. van, Die aan alle wateren zaait : uit het leven van William Chalmers Burns ; zendeling en evangelist, Ede : Hardeman, 1988,

Attribution
This article was originally a direct translation from :de:William Chalmers Burns and partly from :zh:賓惠廉

1815 births
1868 deaths
People from Angus, Scotland
Scottish Presbyterian missionaries
Scottish evangelicals
Presbyterian missionaries in China
Christian missionaries in Fujian
Christian revivalists
Alumni of the University of Aberdeen
Alumni of the University of Glasgow
British expatriates in China